Jamno  is a village in the administrative district of Gmina Szadek, within Zduńska Wola County, Łódź Voivodeship, in central Poland.

The village has a population of 40.

References

Villages in Zduńska Wola County